= Essam Farah =

Essam Farah عصام فرح
- Also known as: Issam Farah
- Origin: beirut, Lebanon
- Genres: Pop
- Occupations: Singer, musician, songwriter
- Instruments: Vocals, Guitar, drums, banjo, violin, harmonica, accordion, synthesizer
- Years active: 2014–present
- Label: Essam Farah

Essam Farah or Essam Samdi (Arabic: عصام فرح), is a Lebanese singer, musician, and songwriter. In 2014 he released his first single Metl el sokker.

== Discography ==
=== Singles ===
- Metl el sokker (2014)
- Malyon Bawsi (2014)
- Tayara Waraa (2015)
- Elbet Chocolate (2016)

== Videography ==
Official music videos
Year	Title	Album	Director
2016	Elbet Chocolate	Single	Ziad Khoury
2015	Tayaret Wara2	Single	Ziad Khoury
2014	Malyon Bawsi	Single	Sam Kayal
